Peter of Diokleia or Petar was an archon of Duklja in the 10th century. The only information on him is from a seal found in the 19th century, which is decorated on the observe with a bust of the Virgin Mary holding a medallion of Christ and flanked by two cruciform invocative monograms. The text is in Greek letters, saying ΠΕΤΡ[Ο]Υ ΑΡΧΟΝΤΟΣ ΔΙΟΚΛ[Ε]ΙΑ[Σ] ΑΜΗΝ (Petr[o]u, Archontos Diokl[e]ias, Amen), i.e. "[Seal] of Peter, archon of Duklja, Amen". The seal shows that although Duklja underwent turmoil in the 9th century, the region still continued under Byzantine rule or at least cultural influence.

The stamp was kept in the Medal cabinet of Berlin and before 1884 it was in a decayed condition. Illustration based on the original by Léon Dardel, was first published in 1884 by Gustave Schlumberger.

The history of Duklja until the 10th century is little known. A list of mythological rulers of this time exist in the dubious Chronicle of the Priest of Duklja compiled in the 13th century or even the 16th and 17th centuries. In this chronicle, the father of Prince Jovan Vladimir (ruled ca. 1000 – 1016) is named Petrislav, possibly meaning that Peter and Petrislav are the same. It is mentioned in the Chronicle of the Priest of Duklja that Petrislav is a descendant of the Trebinje Prince Hvalimir and was given Duklja to rule as part of Hvalimir's domain.

Notes

References

Živković, Tibor (2006). Портрети српских владара (IX-XII) (in Serbian). Belgrade: Zavod za udžbenike. .

10th-century Serbian nobility
11th-century Serbian nobility
Medieval Montenegro
Rulers of Duklja